Kakonda (also known as Cilombo-coñoma, Caconda, or Quilombo) was one of the traditional independent Ovimbundu kingdoms in Angola.

References

Ovimbundu kingdoms